Septuple meter (British: metre) or (chiefly British) septuple time is a meter with each bar (American: measure) divided into 7 notes of equal duration, usually  or  (or in compound meter,  time).

This signature may, for example, be used to indicate a bar of triple meter in which each beat is subdivided into seven parts. In this case, the meter is sometimes characterized as "triple septuple time". It is also possible for a  time signature to be used for an irregular, or "additive" metrical pattern, such as groupings of  eighth notes.

History
Before the 20th century, septuple time was rare in European concert music but is more commonly found in European folk music and in other world cultures.

Asia and the Middle East
In the Thai dance-drama genre lakhon nok and the masked dance-drama khon there is a unique group of songs based on a rhythmic cycle of seven beats, quite unlike the usual rhythmic structures of Thai traditional music. Portions of this repertoire of songs in additive meter date back to the Ayudhia period (1350–1767).

In the Carnatic music of south India, there are thirty-five tāla in five temporal species, multiplied by seven classes of measurement—one of the five species is septuple. The classes of measurement in this "formal" system consist of seven basic tālas (called sūḷādi talas). Each of these is built from three types of component durations: the one-beat anudruta, the two-beat druta, and the variable laghu, which may have three (tisra), four (caturaśra), five (khaṇḍa), seven (miśra), or nine (saṅkīrṇa) beats, and accounts for the five temporal species of each tāla. Two of the resulting thirty-five forms have seven beats in all: the khaṇda form of Rūpaka tāla, with one druta and a five-beat (khaṇda) laghu: , and the tisra form of Tripuṭa, with a three-beat laghu and two druta: . Tisra Tripuṭa is one of the principal talas of the system, and so is often called simply by its basic name, Tripuṭa. Khaṇda Rūpaka, on the other hand, is a comparative rarity.

Carnatic music also has an "informal" system of tālas, which uses a selection of the formal tālas. These include the septuple Tripuṭa, to which is added a Cāpu (fast) version of it, called miśra Cāpu (or ). Miśra Cāpu is one of the most characteristic rhythms in the music of southern India, accounting for well over half of the padam compositions by the 17th-century composer Kshetrayya, and occurs in some of the best-known kīrtanam works by Tyagaraja (1767–1847). The Hindustani tālas used in the north also include septuple patterns. The tala Rupak, for example, has seven beats. (also known at Gīt-tāl) is also a septuple tāla. Two tālas, Dīpcandī and Jhūmrā, have fourteen beats in all, but are divided symmetrically into two halves of  beats each.

Folk music in Turkey employs metres consisting of five, seven, or eleven pulses, as well as metres with irregular subdivisions. In Turkish art music, the system of rhythmic modes called usul consist of rhythmic cycles of two to ten counting units. The pattern of seven beats is called devr-i hindi.

Balkan folk music
Septuple rhythms are characteristic of some European folk idioms, particularly in the Balkan countries. Bulgarian dances are particularly noted for the use of a variety of irregular, or heterometric rhythms. Septuple rhythms are also found in Bulgarian vocal music, such as the koleda ritual songs sung by young men on Christmas Eve and Christmas to bless livestock, households, or specific family members.

Such irregular meters are also found throughout Greece, where they are sometimes identified as originating in neighboring countries. For example, in Epirus, a district bordering Albania, there is a style of singing in imitation of the sound of Byzantine bells, that employs microtonal intervals and is described by the singers themselves as "Albanian" or "pastoral Vlach". The rhythms vary, but sometimes is in bars of seven beats, particularly in the area around Mount Parnassus. The  rhythm of the kalamatianos from the same region, however, is regarded as purely Greek.

European art music

18th century
The last movement of Joseph Haydn's Piano Sonata XVI:12, written as early as the 1750s, has been claimed to use exclusively seven-measure units in its background, if not in its foreground. Performers typically choose a tempo such that the notated  measure sounds like a single beat, projecting a perception of  septuple meter.

19th century
Though rare in the 19th century, septuple metre is occasionally found. Two examples from the piano repertoire entirely in septuple meter are Fugue No. 24, from 36 Fugues for Piano by Anton Reicha (notated in regularly alternating  and  bars), and the Impromptu, Op. 32, no. 8, by Charles-Valentin Alkan, notated in  time.

An example of chamber music from the later 19th century is found in the Piano Trio No. 3, Op. 101, by Brahms.

20th century
Igor Stravinsky's name is often associated with rhythmic innovation in the 20th century, and septuple meter is sometimes found in his music—for example, the closing "General Rejoicing" section (Allegro non troppo), from rehearsal 203 to rehearsal 209, in his ballet The Firebird (1910) is written uniformly in  time. Much more characteristically, septuple bars in Stravinsky's scores are found in a context of constantly changing meters, as for example in his ballet The Rite of Spring (1911–13), where the object appears to be the combination of two- and three-note subdivisions in irregular groupings. This treatment of rhythm subsequently became so habitual for Stravinsky that, when he composed his Symphony in C in 1938–40, he found it worth observing that the first movement had no changes of meter at all (though the metrical irregularities in the third movement of the same work were amongst the most extreme in his entire output).

So many other composers followed Stravinsky's example in the use of irregular meters that the occasional occurrence of septuple-time bars becomes unremarkable from the 1920s onward. This is as true for composers regarded as conservative as for those labeled "progressive" or "avant garde". In the former category, this rhythmic usage was characteristic of compositions from the 1920s and 1930s by Gustav Holst. Septuple bars, for example, are found in passages in his opera The Perfect Fool (1918–22)—notably the two "earth" themes in the ballet of the elements, and the arrival of the Princess, which is "a genuine example of the septuple measure as distinct from those arising merely from prosody"—and in A Choral Fantasia, Op. 51 (bars 70–98, 179–85, and 201–209 are in ). Examples from more "progressive" composers include the first and third movements of the First Cantata, Op. 29 (1938–39), by Anton Webern, and the fourth movement (Intermezzo interrotto) of Béla Bartók's Concerto for Orchestra (1943).

Septuple meter is sometimes employed to characterize particular sections of compositions, such as single variations of pieces in variation form. One example is the third movement (Variations on a Ground), of Holst's Double Concerto for two violins and orchestra, Op. 49, where the 13th and 17th variations are in  time. An example from after the Second World War is found in Part I of Leonard Bernstein's The Age of Anxiety: Symphony No. 2, a theme-and-variations movement in which "Variation X: Più mosso" is notated in regularly alternating  and  bars, each pair amounting to one  bar.

Compositions entirely or predominantly in septuple meter are less common. Five of Holst's settings of English translations of hymns from the ancient Sanskrit Rig Veda, composed between 1907 and 1912, are in septuple meter, specifically "Song of the Frogs" and "Creation" (songs 6 and 8 from his Hymns from the Rig Veda, Op. 24, for voice and piano, composed in 1907–08) as well as "Funeral Hymn" (Choral Hymns from the Rig Veda, Op. 26, Group 1, No. 3 for SATB chorus and orchestra or piano, composed between 1908 and 1910), "Hymn to the Waters" (Choral Hymns from the Rig Veda Group 3 no. 2 for SSA chorus and harp or piano, composed in 1909), and "Hymn to Manas" (Choral Hymns from the Rig Veda Group 4 no. 3 for TTBB chorus with orchestra or unaccompanied, composed in 1912).

Other notable compositions in septuple meter

 "Aire", by Chicago ( and )
 "Alien", by Lamb
 "And the Money Kept Rolling In (and Out)" from Evita by Andrew Lloyd Webber (except for a three-bar introduction in ).
"Ant-Man Main Theme" by Christophe Beck
 "Another World of Beasts" from Final Fantasy VI by Nobuo Uematsu.
 "Barstool Warrior" by Dream Theater from the album Distance Over Time with one brief measure of 
 "Beat Me, Daddy, Seven to the Bar" by Don Ellis
"La Bosniaque", fifth movement of the second pentacle ("Révérences engrenées") of Henri Pousseur's Automates en leur jardinet (2000–2001), mislabeled .
 "Demons" by the National
 "Desert Island Disk" by Radiohead()
"Don't Eat the Yellow Snow" by Frank Zappa
 "Dreaming in Metaphors" by Seal.
 "Estimated Prophet" by the Grateful Dead
 "Etropolis" by Stefan Goldmann
 "The Fish (Schindleria Praematurus)" by Yes
 "Haggstrom", by C418, on Minecraft – Volume Alpha
 "Lucky Seven" by Chris Squire
 "Fix the Sky a Little", by 65daysofstatic.
"Mother" by the Police
Prelude in Lydian Mode by Alexei Stanchinsky
 "Pussy Wiggle Stomp" by Don Ellis
 "Rubylove" by Cat Stevens.
 "Senseless" by Norwegian gothic metal band Theatre of Tragedy is in septuple meter; it was originally track seven on their 2006 album Storm.
 "St. Augustine In Hell" (1993) (1996) by Sting.
 "7/4 (shoreline)" by Broken Social Scene
 "Solsbury Hill" by Peter Gabriel.
 "Stone Soup" by Ned McGowan
 "Szamár Madár" by Venetian Snares (arrangement of a passage from Edward Elgar's Cello Concerto, in )
 "Theme from Tron" by Wendy Carlos is in slow 
 "Ticks and Leeches" by Tool
 "The Tihai" by Don Ellis
 "Tombo in " by José Neto, Flora Purim, and Diana Moreira
 "Turkish Bath" by Ron Myers, performed by the Don Ellis orchestra
 "Unsquare Dance" by Dave Brubeck.
 "Waltz in 7/8" by Yanni.
 "What Does He Want of Me" from Man of La Mancha is in 
 "What Would I Want? Sky" by Animal Collective is in 
 "Whiplash" by Hank Levy, in  subdivided in multiple ways throughout the piece
"Wonder Woman Main Theme" by Hans Zimmer, for the 2017 film
 "Words, Words, Words" (Martin's Laughing Song), from act 2 of Candide, by Leonard Bernstein
 "World Away" by Tweedy

Partially in septuple meter
 
 Adagio, second movement from String Quartet No. 2 (1955) by Benjamin Lees, "largely in  meter"
 "All You Need Is Love" by the Beatles, verses in 
 "Anyone Who Had a Heart" by Burt Bacharach, sung by Dionne Warwick –  turnaround at the end of the bridge, as pointed out to Bacharach by Dionne Warwick.
 "The Battle of Epping Forest" from Selling England by the Pound by Genesis.
 "Box Elder" by Motion City Soundtrack: includes 
 "Breadcrumb Trail" by Slint, in Dave Hooper's 1997 arrangement, verses and other sections in 
"The Cinema Show" from Selling England by the Pound by Genesis concludes with an extended instrumental section in 
 "Diary of a Madman" by Ozzy Osbourne, verses in 
 "Ethiopia" by Red Hot Chili Peppers, in  except for a  chorus
This motif returns multiple times during the song.
 "Heart of Glass" by Blondie, a break in  after the second chorus
 "I Am the Doctor", by Murray Gold, from the soundtrack to the fifth series of Doctor Who
 "I Was Made For Loving You" by Tori Kelly and Ed Sheeran. Intro and chorus alternate  + 
 "Internet Symphony No. 1" by Tan Dun, third movement contains measures in 
 "Laps in Seven", by Sam Bush. (except for the electric mandolin solo which is in  time)
 "Like a Beautiful Smile" by Sting.
 "The Man Who Sailed Around His Soul" by XTC, verses in 
 "Meetings Along the Edge" by Philip Glass and Ravi Shankar develops two themes in 7 and one in 4 beats per measure.
 "Meheeco" by English group Sky. The second part features an alternation of  – . In the live versions, the drums would often continue playing  over the rest of the band's  bars, creating an isorhythm.
 "A Mix Tape", from Avenue Q, by Robert Lopez and Jeff Marx.
 "Money" by Pink Floyd, predominantly in 
 "Mysterious Traveler" by Weather Report (Wayne Shorter).
 "Nothing on My Back" by Sum 41, from the album All Killer No Filler, opening riff in 
 "Outshined" by Soundgarden, verses in 
 "Paranoid Android" by Radiohead. Producer Michael G noted that "Paranoid Android" "flips between  time and  time about 13 times".
 "Los peones de hacienda", from the ballet Estancia by Alberto Ginastera: bars 27–28 (third and fourth bars following rehearsal 65) in 
 "Revolting Children" from Matilda the Musical by Tim Minchin: sections of verses in 
"Ring Out Solstice Bells" by Jethro Tull is in  alternating with  referencing its time signature with the lyric "seven maids move in seven time".
 "The River" by King Gizzard & the Lizard Wizard from their 2015 album Quarters!, sections in both  and 
 "Seven" by Dave Matthews Band (verses in )
 "Speculation", composed by Shoji Meguro for the Persona 4 video game soundtrack.
 "Spiders" by Slipknot
 "Spoonman" by Soundgarden.
"Suicide Mission" by Jack Wall for Mass Effect 2: "a large section or so of  throughout, particularly at the end"
 "Tattooed Love Boys" by The Pretenders.
 "Thunderchild" by Jeff Wayne from his concept album War of the Worlds, primarily in 
 "Time" by Anthrax from the album Persistence of Time.
 "Two Toccatas" by George Antheil.
 "La Villa Strangiato" by Rush, some sections in 

See also
List of musical works in unusual time signatures

References

Sources

 
 
 
 
 
 
 
 
 
 
 
 
 
 
 
 
 
 
 
 
 
 
 
 
 
 
 
 
 
 
 
 
 
 
 
 
 
 
 
 
 
 
 
 
 
 
 
 
 
 
 
 
 
 
 
 
 
 
 
 
 

 
 
 
 
 
 
 
 
 
 
 
 
 
 
 
 
 
 

Asian rhythm
European rhythm
Time signatures
Articles containing video clips